Paul Jonathan Mason (born 1960) is an English man who is known for being one of the world's former heaviest men, weighing in at  at his peak  Mason was given a gastric bypass surgery in 2010, and lost an estimated . He is the heaviest recorded person from the United Kingdom a record which holds to this day.

When he was in his 20s, he started to eat food as a way to avoid dealing with emotional issues that began in his childhood such as child abuse.

Several years earlier he had applied to the National Health Service for gastric bypass surgery, to help him get his weight down. Mason applied several times and in the end waited 10 years before he was approved for surgery. In 2010, two years after beginning counseling, Mason finally had the surgery he desperately needed and wanted. Mason had a further  of loose skin removed at New York’s Lenox Hill Hospital in May 2015.

In 2018 he split with his girlfriend, after this he got addicted to food again.

See also
 List of the heaviest people

References

External links
 Comprehensive overview of Mason's life

1960 births
Living people
20th-century English people
21st-century English people